Michèle Allard is a former French figure skater who competed in ladies' singles and pairs with Alain Giletti. She is the 1956 French champion in both categories.

Results

References
 skatabase

Navigation

French female single skaters
French female pair skaters